Statue of Sam Houston may refer to:

 Statue of Sam Houston (Ney), two versions of the same composition by Elisabet Ney, at the Texas State Capitol and the U.S. Capitol
 Sam Houston Monument, with an equestrian statue by Enrico Cerracchio, at Hermann Park, Houston, Texas, United States
 A Tribute to Courage by David Adickes, Huntsville, Texas, United States